Mary Ellen Balchunis (born June 11, 1954) is an American college professor and former political candidate. She teaches in the Political Science department of La Salle University.

Early life, education and career
Balchunis was born in Philadelphia, Pennsylvania on June 11, 1954. She earned a BA in Sociology from the University of Pennsylvania in 1979. The following year, she earned a Master in Public Administration from Temple University and was a Fulbright Scholar. She began teaching in the political science department at La Salle University in 1991. Balchunis earned a Ph.D. at Temple in 1992. Her dissertation was entitled, "A Study of the Old and New Campaign Politics Models: A Comparative Analysis of Wilson Goode's 1983 and 1987 Philadelphia Mayoral Campaigns".

Congressional elections

2014

Balchunis ran unopposed in the 2014 primary election. She faced Pat Meehan, a former District Attorney, for a seat in the U.S. House of Representatives for Pennsylvania's 7th congressional district. She lost to Meehan by a margin of 62% to 38% in the general election.

2016

Balchunis launched her candidacy on April 18, 2015, by going on a speaking tour through the five counties within the 7th district: Lancaster, Berks, Montgomery, Chester, and Delaware. On April 26, 2016, Balchunis defeated Bill Golderer, a pastor in Philadelphia, to win the Democratic nomination for the 7th district. Her margin of victory in the primary was 74% to 28%. She was defeated in the general election by incumbent Republican Representative Pat Meehan, who won 60% of the vote.

Political positions
Balchunis opposes gerrymandering. She aims to preserve and strengthen Social Security and Medicare, lower the interest rates on student loans, increase the minimum wage and have pay equity between men and women.

Personal life
Balchunis resides in Ardmore, Pennsylvania. She has a daughter, Lauren Harris. Balchunis's mother Adele died in 2014.

References

External links
Mary Ellen Balchunis for U.S. Congress official campaign site

1954 births
University of Pennsylvania School of Arts and Sciences alumni
Temple University alumni
Candidates in the 2014 United States elections
Living people
Pennsylvania Democrats
People from Delaware County, Pennsylvania
Candidates in the 2016 United States elections
La Salle University faculty
21st-century American politicians